Sir Iain Geoffrey Chalmers  (born 3 June 1943) is a British health services researcher, one of the founders of the Cochrane Collaboration, and coordinator of the James Lind Initiative, which includes the James Lind Library and James Lind Alliance.

Education and career

Chalmers qualified in medicine in the mid-1960s, and then practised as a clinician in the United Kingdom and two years (1969-1970) in the Gaza Strip. In the mid-1970s, he became a full-time health services researcher with a particular interest in assessing the effects of care.

Between 1978 and 1992, he was the first director of the National Perinatal Epidemiology Unit in Oxford. There, Chalmers led the development of the electronic Oxford Database of Perinatal Trials (ODPT) and a collection of systematic reviews of randomized trials of care in pregnancy and children published in the two-volume Effective Care in Pregnancy and Childbirth, co-authoring its summary, Guide to Effective Care in Pregnancy and Childbirth.

The National Health Service Research and Development Programme supported extending the approach to other areas of health care. In 1992, Chalmers was appointed director of the UK Cochrane Centre, leading to the development of the international Cochrane Collaboration.

Subsequently, he became founding editor of the James Lind Library, which documents the history and evolution of fair trials of treatments, and helped to establish the James Lind Alliance, a non-profit organization that "aims to identify the most important gaps in knowledge about the effects of treatments". The Library has established strategic agreements with international and non-profit organizations to disseminate its publications to a broad international and multilingual audience. Chalmers inspired champions all over the world leading to the development of the Cochrane Collaboration and by 2011 this collaboration had nearly 30,000 volunteers contributing towards summarising research evidence to improve health. His contributions have been instrumental in advancing international policies on research for health -such as PAHO's Policy on Research for Health, and to promote a better understanding of the importance of building bridges between users and producers of research for health policy and health care delivery.

Chalmers continues to promote better research for better health care by increasing public appreciation of good research through Testing Treatments interactive and the James Lind Library, and by working with others to reduce waste in research.

Publications 

 A Classified Bibliography of Controlled Trials in Perinatal Medicine 1940-1984
 Effectiveness and Satisfaction in Antenatal Care
 Effective Care in Pregnancy and Childbirth
 Britain's gift: a "Medline" of synthesised evidence
 Empirical Evidence of Bias
 The evolution of The Cochrane Library, 1988-2003
 The origins, evolution and future of the Cochrane Database of Systematic Reviews
  Restore true open access to bmj.com
 Systematic Reviews: Reporting, updating, and correcting systematic reviews of the effects of health care
 Select Committee on Health: Memorandum by Sir Iain Chalmers (PI 29)
 James Lind Library
 Testing Treatments
 Testing Treatments Interactive

My Death, My Decision
Iain Chalmers is a Patron of the right to die organization, My Death, My Decision. My Death, My Decision wants to see a more compassionate approach to dying in the UK, including giving people the legal right to a medically assisted death if that is their persistent wish.

References

External links 
 
 James Lind Library

Living people
British medical researchers
Knights Bachelor
National Health Service people
20th-century English medical doctors
1943 births
Cochrane Collaboration people
Members of the National Academy of Medicine